Barringer Hotel, also known as Hall House, was a historic hotel building located at Charlotte, Mecklenburg County, North Carolina. The 12-story, red brick building consisted of the main block constructed in 1940 and five-bay-deep rear addition in 1950.  The tall first level of the façade featured Art Deco-style decoration including a cast-concrete frontispiece with a low-relief stepped parallel lines and terminated at the top into a zig-zag pattern.  The City of Charlotte renovated the structure in 1983 to apartments for elderly, low-income residents.

It was added to the National Register of Historic Places in 2013.

It was demolished on November 6, 2022.

References

Hotel buildings on the National Register of Historic Places in North Carolina
Hotel buildings completed in 1940
Buildings and structures in Charlotte, North Carolina
National Register of Historic Places in Mecklenburg County, North Carolina